Little Traverse may refer to:

In the U.S. state of Michigan:
 Little Traverse Bay
 Little Traverse Township, Michigan

There is also:
 Little Traverse Bay Bands of Odawa Indians
 Little Traverse Light, a lighthouse